Last Day of Summer is a collection of tracks self-released by the garage rock/psychedelic band White Denim on September 23, 2010. The release notes from their official website state: "This record is something we made as a little summer retreat from our ongoing work on the third full length [album]. Many of these tunes have been bouncing around since the formation of the band back in 06. We were super pumped to utilize a few fresh and casual musical approaches on this record." It is available to download for free (with an option to make a donation) from the band's official website. The version of "I'd Have It Just the Way We Were" is a different recording to the one that appears on their previous album, Fits. Last Day of Summer was re-released on CD format on December 5, 2011. The cover art is an homage to Preston Love's Omaha Bar-B-Q.

Track listing

Personnel
James Petralli – vocals, guitar
Joshua Block – drums
Steve Terebecki – vocals, bass
Austin Jenkins – guitar
Danny Reisch – mix engineer, mastering engineer

References

External links
 Last Day of Summer

White Denim albums
2010 albums